New Taipei City Constituency VI includes the western part of Banqiao in New Taipei City. The district was formerly known as Taipei County Constituency VI (2008-2010) and was created in 2008, when all local constituencies of the Legislative Yuan were reorganized to become single-member districts.

Current district
 Banqiao:
Villages (65 in total):Zhongzheng(中正里), Rencui(仁翠里), Jieshou(介壽里), Gongguan(公舘里), Wenhua(文化里), Wensheng(文聖里), Wencui(文翠里), Wende(文德里), Min'an(民安里), Minquan(民權里), Yong'an(永安里),Guanghua(光華里), Guangrong(光榮里), Jicui(吉翠里), Jiangcui(江翠里), Baishou(百壽里), Zili(自立里), Ziqiang(自強里), Hongcui(宏翠里), Chisong(赤松里), Xingfu(幸福里), Zhongcheng(忠誠里),Zhongcui(忠翠里), Mingcui(明翠里), Songbo(松柏里), Songci(松翠里), Shehou(社後里), Jinhua(金華里), Qingcui(青翠里), Jianguo(建國里), Bocui(柏翠里), Liufang(流芳里), Xiangshe(香社里), Xiangya(香雅里),Liuhou(留侯里), Chuncui(純翠里), Guoguang(國光里), Piqian(埤墘里), Juguang(莒光里), Zhuangjing(莊敬里), Lnacui(嵐翠里), Zhaoyang(朝陽里), Gangwei(港尾里), Gangzui(港嘴里), Gangde(港德里), Huajiang(華江里),Huacui(華翠里), Yangming(陽明里), Huangshi(黃石里), Xinmin(新民里), Xinsheng(新生里), Xinpu(新埔里), Xinhai(新海里), Xincui(新翠里), Xinxing(新興里), Hansheng(漢生里), Mancui(滿翠里),Fucui(福翠里), Decui(德翠里), Longcui(龍翠里), Liancui(聯翠里), Huaicui(懷翠里), Yixiu(挹秀里), Nanxing(湳興里), Xitou(溪頭里)

Legislators

Election results

 

 
 
 
 
 
 
 
 
 
 
 
 
 

2008 establishments in Taiwan
Constituencies in New Taipei